Sylvietta, the crombecs, is a genus of African warblers. Formerly placed in the massively paraphyletic Sylviidae, it is now considered to belong to a newly recognized family found only in Africa, Macrosphenidae.

It contains the following species:
 Green crombec, Sylvietta virens
 Lemon-bellied crombec, Sylvietta denti
 White-browed crombec, Sylvietta leucophrys
 Chapin's crombec, Sylvietta (leucophrys) chapini - possibly extinct (late 20th century?)
 Northern crombec, Sylvietta brachyura
 Philippa's crombec, Sylvietta philippae
 Red-capped crombec, Sylvietta ruficapilla
 Red-faced crombec, Sylvietta whytii
 Somali crombec, Sylvietta isabellina
 Long-billed crombec, Sylvietta rufescens

References
 Del Hoyo, J.; Elliot, A. & Christie D. (editors). (2006). Handbook of the Birds of the World. Volume 11: Old World Flycatchers to Old World Warblers. Lynx Edicions. .

Taxonomy articles created by Polbot